A Cape Cod house is a low, broad, single or double-story frame building with a moderately-steep-pitched gabled roof, a large central chimney, and very little ornamentation. Originating in New England in the 17th century, the simple symmetrical design was constructed of local materials to withstand the stormy weather of Cape Cod. It features a central front door flanked by multipaned windows. The space above the first floor was often left as unfinished attic space, with or without windows on the gable ends. 

The building type enjoyed a boom in popularity and adaptation to modern needs in the 1930s–1950s, particularly with Colonial Revival embellishments. It remains a feature of New England homebuilding.

History

The Cape Cod cottage–type house (it is a form or type, not a style, though commonly--mistakenly--referred to as a style) originated in the wood-building counties of England and was brought to America by Puritan carpenters. The harsh climate of New England tested the pioneers' ingenuity, and by lowering the house and pulling its plan into more of a square footprint, they transported the English hall and parlor house, now called the Cape Cod cottage. The type has survived and emerged as a one- to one-and-a-half-story house with wooden shutters and a clapboard or shingle exterior. Using local materials—cedar for roofing and siding shingles, oak and pine for framing and flooring—settlers built houses locally adapted to New England's extreme winter climate. To fight the chill, they built massive central chimneys and low-ceilinged rooms to conserve heat. The steep-roof characteristic of New England homes minimized snow load. Finally, colonists installed shutters on the windows to hold back heavy winds.

The Reverend Timothy Dwight IV (1752–1817), president of Yale University from 1795 to 1817, coined the term "Cape Cod house" after a visit to the Cape in 1800. His observations were published posthumously in Travels in New England and New York (1821–1822). The type was popularized more broadly in a slightly more elaborate Colonial Revival variant popularized in the 1930s–1950s, though traditional unornamented Capes remain common in New England.

Colonial and federal Capes (17th century – early 19th century)
Colonial-era Capes were most prevalent in the Northeastern United States and Atlantic Canada. They were made of wood and covered in wide clapboard or shingles, often unpainted, which weathered grey over time. Most houses were small, usually  in size. Often windows of different sizes were worked into the gable ends, with those of nine and six panes the most common.

The type has a symmetrical appearance, with the front door in the center of the house and a large central chimney that could often accommodate back-to-back fireplaces. The main bedroom was on the first floor, with an often-unfinished loft on the second. A typical early house had no dormers and little or no exterior ornamentation.

Framing and layout

The overwhelming majority of early Capes were timber framed, with three bays formed by four bents. A few late examples of early Capes used stud framing, and plank framing was also used.

The first Cape Cod houses fall into four categories: the quarter, half, three-quarter, and full Cape. The comparatively rare quarter Cape is a single bay, usually a wider "outside" bay that becomes rooms. It has a single door and a single window on the front but is full depth. The half Cape is two bays, with a door to one side of the house and two windows on one side of the door; the three-quarter Cape has a door with two windows on one side and a single window on the other; while the full Cape consists of a front door in the center of the home, flanked on each side by two windows. Otherwise, the three categories of early Cape Cod houses were nearly identical in layout. Inside the front door, a central staircase led to the small upper level, which consisted of two children's bedrooms. The lower floor consisted of a hall for daily living (including cooking, dining, and gathering) and the parlor, or master bedroom.

Some use a different naming system and call the full-size version a "double Cape", but this is used more often for an extended duplex structure.

"High post", also known as "knee wall", Capes were originally an uncommon variant but became more common into the 19th century, emerging as a feature of Cape-derived vernacular architecture in the Midwest. The posts extend vertically past the first floor, increasing usable space on the second floor and simplifying joinery, at a cost of structural rigidity. The knee wall was often fenestrated with small, low windows.

Adaptations
Over the years, owners doubled the full Cape and added wings onto the rear or sides, typically single-storied. Dormers were added for increased space, light, and ventilation. A screened-in porch was sometimes added to one side of the home, rarely the front.

Colonial Revival (1930s–1950s)
Colonial Revival Cape Cod houses are very similar to colonial Cape Cod houses, but some have the chimney at one end of the living room on the side of the house. Elaborate replicas were designed for the affluent, while architects such as Royal Barry Wills modernized the Cape for middle-class families by including modern amenities that addressed demands for increased privacy and technology, including bathrooms, kitchens, and garages. Adaptations proliferated throughout suburbs that emerged after World War II, and planned communities like Levittown, New York, offered Cape Cod–style tract housing, particularly to returning soldiers.

See also
 Cape Cod style of lighthouse architecture
 Strawberry box houses, homes built with a simplified Cape Cod design

References

External links
 Retro Renovation - The Royal Barry Wills Cape Cod House 
 Cape Cod Home- The Original American Cottage

American architectural styles
Colonial architecture in the United States
House

House styles